The Magic Make-Up Box is an Indian 2003 children's television show that aired on Zee TV. The series features a young boy named Abhay who with the help of his friends discovers a magical make-up box that helps him transform into any character, whether it is from the past, present or future.

Cast
Gufi Paintal as Brithari
Shweta Prasad as Maya
Dhairya Oza as Abhay
Aditya Vaidya as Sikander
Ankit Shah as Monty

References

External links
The Magic Make-Up Box Official Site on In-House Productions

Zee TV original programming
Indian television series
Indian children's television series
2003 Indian television series debuts
Indian fantasy television series